Phosphirane is the organophosphorus compound with the formula C2H4PH.  It is a colorless gas of no commercial value. As the simplest cyclic, saturated organophosphorus compound, phosphirane is the prototype of a family of related compounds that have attracted attention from the research community.  Phosphirane was first prepared by reaction of 1,2-dichloroethane with the conjugate base of phosphine. Phosphiranes, that is substituted phosphirene compounds where one or more of the H's are replaced organic substituents, are far more commonly discussed than the parent phosphirane.

References 

 

Phosphorus heterocycles
Three-membered rings